Monster Bass is a simulation fishing video game for the PlayStation. It was published in Japan in June 2000, and released in the United States in December 2002 by XS Games and developed by Magical Company. The game has been rereleased for the PlayStation 3, and PlayStation Portable.

The player must catch zombie fish, spiders, and other zombielike sea creatures.

References

Fishing video games
PlayStation 3 games
PlayStation Portable games
XS Games games
Single-player video games
Magical Company games